Pentwyn (or Pen-twyn)  may refer to the following places in south-east Wales:

Pentwyn, Cardiff, a district of the city of Cardiff
Pentwyn (electoral ward)
Pentwyn, Caerphilly, a village in the Darran Valley
Pen-twyn, Carmarthenshire, a hamlet near Cross Hands
Pentwyn, Focriw, a hamlet in Caerphilly, near Focriw
Pentwyn, Torfaen, a village near Abersychan
Pen-twyn, Trinant, a village in Caerphilly, near Trinant
Pentwyn Berthlwyd, a village in Merthyr Tydfil, near Treharris
Pentwyn Deintyr, village in Merthyr Tydfil
Pentwyn-mawr, village in Caerphilly, near Pontllanfraith

See also 

 Pentwyn, Llanllowell, 16th-century farmhouse in Monmouthshire, Wales
 Pentwyn, Rockfield, 19th-century house in Monmouthshire